Oakland general strike may refer to:

1946 Oakland general strike
2011 Oakland general strike